Mawalih is an upscale residential area in Muscat, in northeastern Oman.The three main landmarks here are the Muscat City Center, Markaz Al Bahja And Rahaf's house.

References

Populated places in the Muscat Governorate